Ken Flach and Robert Seguso were the defending champions, but Robert Seguso chose not to participate. Flach partnered with Todd Witsken, but lost in the quarterfinals to Mark Woodforde and Todd Woodbridge .

Woodforde and Woodbridge went on to win the title, defeating Patrick McEnroe and Jonathan Stark in the finals, 6–3, 1–6, 6–3.

Seeds
The top four seeded teams received byes into the second round.

Draw

Finals

Top half

Bottom half

References

External links
 Cincinnati Draw History Book
 1992 Cincinnati Masters Doubles Draw

Doubles